(April 14, 1900 – March 13, 1933) was a Japanese author in the early 20th century. Most of his works have been published through the Aozora Bunko project.

Japanese writers
1900 births
1933 deaths